The 2010–11 season is French football club Olympique Lyonnais's 52nd season in Ligue 1 and their 22nd consecutive season in the top division of French football. The season is the club's second straight season overall where it has not won any silverware. Due to the club's second-place finish the previous season, Lyon will compete in the UEFA Champions League for the 11th-straight season.

News
On 8 June 2010, Lyon reached a three-year agreement on a partnership with Groupama, an international insurance company based in Paris. The deal is valued at €4.5 million a year. The company's logo will be displayed on the back of the player's shirts.

On 9 June, French newspaper L'Equipe reported that Olympique Lyonnais sporting director Marino Faccioli would depart the club on 1 July to become the director of the France national football team. The report also stated that Faccioli was new manager Laurent Blanc's first-choice for the position. Two hours later, Faccioli denied the report stating that no agreements had been made between the two parties. On the previous day, Lyon confirmed the arrival of Philippe Sauze as a new general director. Sauze is the current vice-president of American company Electronic Arts. The hiring of Sauze will redefined the different functions of several directors with the "possible departure of Marino Faccioli to the France team" being in mind.

On 14 June, Lyon confirmed their first transfer arrival to the club after reaching an agreement with Rennes for the transfer of Jimmy Briand. The transfer fee was priced at €6 million and Briand is expected to replace Sidney Govou who departed the club for Greek side Panathinaikos on 5 July.

On 22 July, Lyon officials announced that the club had signed captain Cris to a two-year contract extension until 2013.

On 23 August 2010, Lyon confirmed on its website that the club had reached an agreement with Bordeaux for the transfer of Gourcuff. Gourcuff had reportedly stated the previous day that he wanted to join Lyon. After successfully passing his medical on 24 August, Gourcuff will sign a long-term contract with the club and the transfer fee is priced at €22 million, which will be paid in three installments by 31 December 2012.

On 6 March 2011, Lyon officials confirmed that midfielder Jérémy Toulalan signed a contract extension with Lyon until 2015.

Transfers

Summer in

|}

Total spending:  €28 million

Summer Out

|}

Total income:  €4.7 million

Winter out

|}

Total income:  €6 million

Squad information

Club

Coaching staff

Other information

Team kit
On 7 August 2009, Lyon announced that the club would be vacating the club's kit deal with Umbro in order to sign a ten-year deal with the German sportswear brand Adidas, effective at the start of the 2010–11 season with Lyon earning €5 million a year annually from the deal. On 1 July 2010, the club's new home kit was unveiled to the public. The shirt has a white base color with the club's traditional red and blue stripe. However, the stripe, unlike previous seasons, is positioned diagonally across the shirt running from left to right. The club's sponsor, BetClic, features prominently in the middle of the shirt. On 13 July, the club's away kit was unveiled. The kit is strikingly similar to the Russia national team away kit and is mostly burgundy with gold linings around the collar, shoulders, shorts, and socks. The away shirt will feature the club's new sponsor, Everest Poker. The club's European kit was unveiled on 31 July.

|
|
|

Pre-season
On 17 June 2010, Lyon confirmed that the team would play six friendly matches ahead of the 2010–11 football season. Prior to contesting the preparation matches, the team trained in the mountainous commune of Tignes. On 7 July, Lyon contested their first match against Swiss club Servette at the Stade Eric Cantona in Tignes. Lyon won the match 3–1 with Ederson scoring a brace in a span of four minutes. The following week, the club embarked on a road trip first traveling to Portugal to play Sporting CP in Lisbon. Lyon lost the match 2–0 conceding the first goal in the 3rd minute of play courtesy of Tonel and, later in the second half, allowing a goal from winger Yannick Djaló to seal the match for the home team. Lyon then traveled to Italy to play Juventus in Cosenza on 24 July. The team suffered their second consecutive defeat losing to the Italians 2–1. Lyon, initially, took the lead following a penalty conversion from Ederson in the 22nd minute, his third goal of the pre-season campaign. However, following an Aly Cissokho red card midway through the first half, Lyon played the rest of the match with ten men and conceded a penalty to Juventus, which was converted by Alessandro Del Piero in the 39th minute. The game-winning goal was scored by midfielder Simone Pepe in the 75th minute.

After departing Italy, the team ventured to England to participate in the 2010 edition of the Emirates Cup. Lyon contested matches on back-to-back days against Scottish club Celtic and Italian club Milan. In the match against Celtic, Lyon took a two-goal lead courtesy of goals from Michel Bastos and youth product Harry Novillo with the former converting a blistering free kick. However, following the entrance of several youth players for Lyon, the club conceded two late goals from Celtic to even the match at 2–2. Against Milan, several veteran players such as Hugo Lloris and Jérémy Toulalan made their debuts in the tournament. Lyon conceded the opening goal in the 55th minute with Milan striker Marco Borriello connecting on a cross from the left side after his shot was initially saved by Lloris. Lyon evened the match in the 79th minute with Jimmy Briand scoring his second goal of the pre-season after running onto a header following a perfect cross from Miralem Pjanić. The 1–1 scoreline was eventually the final result and Lyon were set to be crowned champions of the competition, however, following Arsenal's 3–2 victory over Celtic, the debutantes were knocked back into third place where they remained. Prior to playing in the pre-season tournament, Lyon played Nottingham Forest on 28 July at the City Ground in Nottingham coming out of the match with a 3–1 win. New signing Jimmy Briand and striker Bafétimbi Gomis recorded goals in the match with the latter netting two.

Friendly

Emirates Cup

Last updated: 23 June 2010Source: OLWeb.fr

Competitions

Ligue 1

League table

Results summary

Results by round

Matches

Last updated: 2 May 2011Source: Ligue de Football Professionnel

Coupe de France

Last updated: 23 January 2011Source: Ligue de Football Professionnel

Coupe de la Ligue

Last updated: 14 December 2010Source: LFP

UEFA Champions League

Lyon entered the 2010–11 UEFA Champions League for the 11th straight season having come off a successful European campaign last year, in which the club reached the semi-finals of the competition. Due to the club's second-place finish last year, Lyon were automatically inserted into the group stage portion of the competition. On 26 August 2010, draw for the group stage of the Champions League was determined. Due to Braga's victory over Sevilla in the third qualifying round, Lyon were inserted into Pot 1. Following the draw, Lyon were inserted into Group B with Portuguese club Benfica from Pot 2, German club Schalke 04 from Pot 3, and Israeli club Hapoel Tel Aviv from Pot 4.

Group B

Knockout phase

Round of 16

Start formations

Starting XI
Lineup that started in the club's league match  against Auxerre on 10 May 2011.

Squad stats

Appearances and goals
Last updated on 10 May 2011.

|-
|colspan="14"|Players sold after the start of the season:

|}

Other statistics
Note: For all official competitions
{| class="sortable" border="2" cellpadding="4" cellspacing="0" style="text-align:left; margin: 1em 1em 1em 0; background: #f9f9f9; border: 1px #aaa solid; border-collapse: collapse; font-size: 95%;"
|-
!class="sortable" width="50px"|No.
!width="50px"|Pos.
!class="sortable" width="130px"|Nationality
!width="130px"|Player
!width="70px" style="background: #FFFFFF"| Assists
!width="70px" style="background: #FFFFFF"| Minutes Played
!width="50px" style="background: #FFEE99"| 
!width="50px" style="background: #FFEE99"|   
!width="50px" style="background: #FF8888"| 
|-
|1 || GK ||  France ||  || 0 || 3900 || 0 || 0 || 0
|----
|2 || DF ||  France ||  || 0 || 404 || 2 || 0 || 0
|----
|3 || DF ||  Brazil ||  || 0 || 1994 || 3 || 0 || 0
|----
|4 || DF ||  Senegal ||  || 0 || 2590 || 8 || 1 || 0
|----
|5 || DF ||  Croatia ||  || 0 || 2955 || 10 || 2 || 0
|----
|6 || MF ||  Sweden ||  || 2 || 2890 || 5 || 0 || 0
|----
|7 || FW ||  France ||  || 5 || 2792 || 7 || 0 || 0
|----
|8 || MF ||  Bosnia and Herzegovina ||  || 1 || 1744 || 4 || 0 || 0
|----
|9 || FW ||  Argentina ||  || 5 || 2486 || 2 || 0 || 0
|----
|10 || MF ||  Brazil ||  || 0 || 253 || 0 || 0 || 0
|----
|11 || MF ||  Brazil ||  || 7 || 2329 || 8 || 1 || 0
|----
|12 || DF ||  France ||  || 1 || 675 || 1 || 0 || 0
|----
|13 || DF ||  France ||  || 1 || 3635 || 6 || 1 || 0
|----
|15 || FW ||  France ||  || 0 || 7 || 0 || 0 || 0
|----
|18 || FW ||  France ||  || 3 || 2876 || 0 || 0 || 0
|----
|19 || MF ||  Argentina ||  || 2 || 743 || 0 || 0 || 0
|----
|20 || DF ||  France ||  || 0 || 2845 || 2 || 0 || 2
|----
|21 || MF ||  France ||  || 2 || 1718 || 3 || 0 || 0
|-----
|22 || MF ||  France ||  || 0 || 244 || 0 || 0 || 0
|----
|24 || MF ||  France ||  || 1 || 1168 || 6 || 1 || 0
|----
|28 || MF ||  France ||  || 1 || 2622 || 6 || 0 || 0
|----
|29 || MF ||  France ||  || 3 || 2283 || 1 || 0 || 0
|----
|30 || GK ||  France ||  || 0 || 210 || 1 || 1 || 0
|----
|38 || FW ||  France ||  || 2 || 146 || 0 || 0 || 0
|----
|39 || FW ||  France ||  || 0 || 0 || 0 || 0 || 0
|----
|45 || GK ||  France ||  || 0 || 0 || 0 || 0 || 0
|----
|48 || MF ||  France ||  || 0 || 0 || 0 || 0 || 0
|----
.

References

External links
Olympique Lyonnais Official Website

Olympique Lyonnais seasons
Lyon
Lyon